The FIS Nordic World Ski Championships 1934 took place on February 20–25, 1934 in Sollefteå, Sweden.

Men's cross country

18 km 
February 22, 1934

50 km 
February 24, 1934

4 × 10 km relay
February 25, 1934

Germany's silver was the first for the nation at the FIS Nordic World Ski Championships. While battling for the silver medal, Sweden's Arthur Häggblad and Norway's Oddbjørn Hagen got off course during their final leg and lost about 10 minutes. They were both passed by Germany, and Häggblad beat Hagen at the finish line for the bronze medal.

Men's Nordic combined

Individual 
February 20, 1934

Men's ski jumping

Individual large hill 
February 20, 1934

Medal table

References
FIS 1934 Cross country results
FIS 1934 Nordic combined results
FIS 1934 Ski jumping results
Results from German Wikipedia
Hansen, Hermann & Sveen, Knut. (1996) VM på ski '97. Alt om ski-VM 1925-1997 Trondheim: Adresseavisens Forlag. p. 49. . 

FIS Nordic World Ski Championships
Nordic Skiing
1934 in Nordic combined
1934 in Swedish sport
February 1934 sports events
Nordic skiing competitions in Sweden